"Just Ask Your Heart" is a song written by Diane DeNota, Joe Ricci, and Pete Damato and performed by Frankie Avalon. The song reached #7 on the Billboard Top 100 in 1959.

The song was arranged by Peter De Angelis.

The song was ranked #59 on Billboard magazine's Top Hot 100 songs of 1959.

Other versions
Mike Preston released a version as the B-side to his single "Mr. Blue" in the United Kingdom in October 1959.
Roy Young released a version as the B-side to his single "Hey Little Girl" in the United Kingdom in October 1959.
Svenne & Lotta released a version as the B-side to their single "Do You Want To Dance" in Sweden in 1973.

References

1959 songs
1959 singles
1973 singles
Frankie Avalon songs
Chancellor Records singles
Decca Records singles
Fontana Records singles